Cereus pierre-braunianus  is a species of columnar cactus found in NE Goiás in Brazil.

References

External links
 
 

pierre-braunianus